The Society for the Study of Amphibians and Reptiles (SSAR) is an international herpetological society.  It is a non-profit organization supporting education, conservation, and research related to reptiles and amphibians.  Regular publications include the Journal of Herpetology and Herpetological Review.  It is the largest international herpetological society, and is recognized worldwide for having the most diverse program of publications, meetings, and other activities.

The SSAR Conservation Committee brings conservation issues that affect reptiles and amphibians to the attention of state and federal government agencies, non-government organizations, and herpetologists worldwide. The committee serves as a liaison between the SSAR and public and private groups to provide expert advice, factual knowledge, and educational information about problems confronting amphibians and reptiles, including habitat protection, endangered, threatened, and special concern species, commercial and private use, contaminants, and priorities for conservation-oriented research. 
The committee coordinates SSAR responses to proposed national and international legislation and other conservation matters involving reptiles and amphibians. Official responses are submitted for approval by the President and Secretary before public release. Chair submits annual report to Secretary prior to the annual meeting of the Board. 
The SSAR also supports numerous grants programs, international exchanges and international cooperative efforts for study and publications.

History
The society was founded as a regional organization, The Ohio Herpetological Society (OHS), by two young but serious-minded amateurs, Kraig Adler and David M. Dennis, then 16 and 17 years of age respectively. They decided in the fall of 1957 to formalize interactions amongst a small group of amateur herpetologists throughout Ohio and began publishing a combined journal and newsletter (called the Trimonthly Report) in January 1958. The name of the society was changed to The Society for the Study of Amphibians and Reptiles on January 1, 1967.

Publications
The SSAR publishes a number of books and series including:

 Catalogue of American Amphibians and Reptiles
 Contributions to Herpetology
 Facsimile Reprints in Herpetology
 Herpetological Circulars
 Herpetological Conservation
 Herpetological Review
 Journal of Herpetology

References

External links
 Official Society Homepage
 online open access version of the Catalogue of American Amphibians and Reptiles

Herpetology organizations
Hobbyist organizations
Reptile conservation organizations
Natural Science Collections Alliance members